"Forty Years On" is a song written by Edward Ernest Bowen and John Farmer in 1872.

It was originally written for Harrow School, but has also been adopted by many other schools including Beverley Grammar School (reputedly the oldest state school in England), Dover Grammar School for Boys, Wellington College, Wellington, Otahuhu College, Auckland, Melbourne High School, Netherthorpe School, Tormead School, Spalding Grammar School, Pretoria Boys High School, Nelson College, Napier Boys' High School, Woodford County High School for Girls, Colyton Grammar School, Camberwell Grammar School, Bolton School, Bolton School Boys Division, Bolton School Girls Division, Frensham (Mittagong, NSW) Mayfield Comprehensive School, Putney, London in the early 1960s and Wroxall Abbey School.

It is specifically about life at school, and is meant to give pupils now an idea of what it will be like in forty years when they return to their old school, and to remind old boys about their school life.

It is the main school song of Harrow School, and is sung there at the end of any "Songs" – occasions when old boys of the school return to hear the schools songs being sung by current pupils, or an occasion within houses for singing the same songs at the end of each term – followed by "Auld Lang Syne" and the British National Anthem ("God Save The King"). The "Churchill" verse, written to celebrate the life of one most famous Old Harrovian, Sir Winston Churchill is only sung once a year at a special Churchill Songs. Traditionally, verse three is sung by Old Harrovians in attendance at School Songs. The Churchill verse The penultimate Follow Up! in each chorus is sung unaccompanied by the School XII, which is made up of the best singers in the top year.

"With the tramp of the twenty-two men" refers to the twenty-two players on the field during a game of Harrow football, a game that is ancestral to association football and played exclusively at Harrow School - this part may be likewise altered at other schools for other sports like rugby or football that may be more significant to the school.

It inspired the title of (and is sung in) Forty Years On, a play by Alan Bennett. The song was also used in the films Young Winston (1972) and Never Let Me Go (2010).

Lyrics
Forty years on, when afar and asunder
Parted are those who are singing today,
When you look back, and forgetfully wonder
What you were like in your work and your play,
Then, it may be, there will often come o’er you,
Glimpses of notes like the catch of a song –
Visions of boyhood shall float them before you,
Echoes of dreamland shall bear them along,

Follow up! Follow up! Follow up
Follow up! Follow up
Till the field ring again and again,
With the tramp of the twenty-two men.
Follow up! Follow up!

Routs and discomfitures, rushes and rallies,
Bases attempted, and rescued, and won,
Strife without anger and art without malice, –
How will it seem to you, forty years on?
Then, you will say, not a feverish minute
Strained the weak heart and the wavering knee,
Never the battle raged hottest, but in it.
Neither the last nor the faintest, were we!

Follow up! etc....

Oh the great days. in the distance enchanted,
Days of fresh air, in the rain and the sun,
How we rejoiced as we struggled and panted –
Hardly believable, forty years on!
How we discoursed of them, one with another,
Auguring triumph, or balancing fate,
Loved the ally with the heart of a brother,
Hated the foe with a playing at hate!

Follow up etc.

Forty years on, growing older and older,
Shorter in wind, as in memory long,
Feeble of foot, and rheumatic of shoulder,
What will it help you that once you were strong?
God give us bases to guard or beleaguer,
Games to play out, whether earnest or fun;
Fights for the fearless, and goals for the eager,
Twenty, and thirty, and forty years on!

Follow up etc.

Churchill Verse:

Blazoned in honour! For each generation
You kindled courage to stand and to stay;
You led our fathers to fight for the nation,
Called "Follow up" and yourself showed the way.
We who were born in the calm after thunder
Cherish our freedom to think and to do;
If in our turn we forgetfully wonder,
Yet we'll remember we owe it to you.

Follow up! etc.

The original Churchill verse, sung to him on 12 November 1954, was as follows:
Sixty years on—though in time growing older,
Younger at heart you return to the Hill:
You, who in days of defeat ever bolder,
Led us to Victory, serve Britain still.
Still there are bases to guard or beleaguer,
Still must the battle for Freedom be won:
Long may you fight, Sir, who fearless and eager
Look back to-day more than sixty years on

The Starehe Boys' Centre and School rendition
Adapted from the Harrow School version, written in 1872:

Forty years on, when afar and asunder,
Parted are those who are singing today,
When we look back and forgetfully wonder
What we were like in our work and our play:
Brotherhood strong and our teachers devoted,
Assembly, Chapel, the House where we grew,
Posho, Githeri, the Founders' Day dinner,
Talks in Baraza, the friendship we knew.

Lenga Juu! Lenga Juu! Lenga Juu! Lenga Juu!
Lenga Juu! Lenga Juu!
Give honour again and again,
To Starehe where we became men,
Lenga Juu! Lenga Juu!

O the great days in the distance enchanted,
Hours in the classroom and hours in the field,
In games and athletics we struggled and panted,
Learning to strive hard and never to yield,
Scouting, exploring, those long expeditions,
Fighting of fires, swimming and First Aid,
Playing of music, debating and drama,
Voluntary service – our first steps we made.

Lenga Juu! Lenga Juu! etc.

Forty years on growing older and older,
Shorter in wind as in memory long,
Feeble of foot and rheumatic of shoulder,
What will it help us that once we were strong?
God gives us duty for us to discharge it,
Problems to face, struggle with and overcome,
Service to render and glory to covet,
Twenty and thirty and forty years on!

Lenga Juu! Lenga Juu! etc.

Other uses
"Forty Years On" is the school song of Wellington College in Wellington, New Zealand. The "tramp of the twenty-two men" line is altered and instead is "the tramp of the thirty true men" in reference to rugby union, the national sport. It is also sung at Napier Boys' High School in Napier, at the breakup ceremony at Waitaki Boys' High School in the 1960s, and at Timaru Boys' High School at least from 1913. A variation of the song was also sung at Christchurch Boys' High School at least during the later 1940s and early 1950s. Feilding Agricultural High School (F.A.H.S), in Feilding, also used it as its school song for a number of years.

In Australia, the song is sung at a number of schools. In the Australian state of Victoria, the song is sung regularly at prestigious independent schools Wesley College, Melbourne, Haileybury, Melbourne, Carey Baptist Grammar School, Camberwell Grammar School and Scotch College, Melbourne, being the official Old Boy anthem and at Melbourne High School's Speech Night (Graduation Night). Wynnum State high and Rockhampton Girl's Grammar School (School Song). Only the first and last verses (excluding the Winston Churchill verse) are sung. Rather than the "tramp of the twenty-two men", Haileybury College, Carey, Camberwell Grammar School, Scotch College and Melbourne High School all replace the line with the "tramp of the thirty-six men" in reference to Australian rules football being the dominant football code in Victoria. It is also the school song of Frensham School in NSW, an all-girls boarding school, where it is traditionally sung on the school's birthday and at Old Girl's reunions.

In the United Kingdom: the school song of the old Brewood Grammar School for boys, Netherthorpe School, Colyton Grammar School, Dover Grammar School, Woodford County High School in Essex, Beverley Grammar School in East Yorkshire, Bolton School, Manchester Grammar School, Stand Grammar School Whitefield, High Storrs Grammar School, Sheffield, Ecclesfield Grammar School, Sheffield (1931–1973) the now-defunct Salford Grammar School, the former Wyggeston Grammar School for Boys, Leicester (succeeded by Wyggeston and Queen Elizabeth I College) and Harrow School's affiliated school, The John Lyon School.  In the 1950s and 1960s, it was also the school song of Clifton High School in Bristol, an all-girls school at the time. It is also the school song of Wycombe High School for girls and was also sung at the end of term in the 1980s at Wycombe Abbey School, in whose songbook it figured. It was also sung by King Edward's Grammar School for Boys, Five Ways, Birmingham, in the 1950s by all the school leavers.  It was also the school song of Lawnswood (formerly Leeds Modern School) hence the title of Alan Bennett's play since he is a former pupil. Also sung at the now-defunct Helston Grammar School in Helston, Cornwal, England.

In the King's School, Canterbury, the song was sung in the 1920s. It was replaced with 'The School of Theodore' hymn.

In the United States: sung at the Cranbrook Kingswood School in Bloomfield Hills, Michigan (excluding the Winston Churchill verse) at the commencement ceremony. Also sung at St. Timothy's School in Stevenson, Maryland as part of a tradition dating back to 1882 (though it is sung faster and with some major alterations in the lyrics).

In India: the Cathedral and John Connon School of Bombay's school song, Prima in Indus, is an adaptation of this.

In Sri Lanka: it is used as the school anthem of Kandy Girls' High School, a prestigious school. 

In Kenya: it is sung on Founders' Day at Starehe Boys' Centre and School.

In South Africa: at Pretoria Boys High School, Pretoria, it is sung at all School Valedictions and assemblies at which Old Boys are present, with certain minor adaptions. "Twenty-two good men" is substituted by "thirty good men". It is also sung at Westville Boys' High School, Durban, when the matrics have their speech night and ring the Swain bell symbolizing their departure from the school and continued ties to its family. The ringing of the bell is the final act of the Matric group before the final exams. Also the school song for girls' school Girls Collegiate School,  Pietermaritzburg - references to males replaced with female one's.

In Thailand, at Vajiravudh College considered to be the country's best boarding school built by King Rama VI (King Vajiravudh) in 1910, the "tramp of twenty-two men" became "The Might of Thirty Best Men" in reference to the school's supremacy in Rugby.  There are also lyrics in Thai which is sung each year before the King of Thailand at the Graduation Ceremony.

In Hong Kong, the melody is used by Queen's College as its school song, with its lyrics written by Headmaster Mr. William Kay (1920). The school song of Heep Yunn School is also adapted from this song but its lyrics are in Chinese, rather than English which Queen's College uses.

In Canada, the girls at Havergal College in Toronto also sing this at their candlelight ceremony - a "passing of the torch" between the incoming and outgoing graduating classes.

A shortened and slightly altered version of this song is used near the beginning of the 2010 film adaptation of Never Let Me Go.

References 

Songs about school
1872 songs
British songs
Institutional songs